Rafael Martínez Barrena (born 10 December 1983 in Madrid) is a Spanish artistic gymnast. He has represented Spain at the World Championship, European and Olympic Level.

He represented Spain at the 2004 Summer Olympics, where he placed 5th in the all-around. In 2005, he was the European All Around Champion. He narrowly missed a medal in the same event at the 2005 World Artistic Gymnastics Championships, where he placed 4th in the Final. He placed 9th the next year. At the 2007 European Championships, he placed 4th in the All Around and won the Floor Exercise title. Martinez was a member of the Spanish Team at the 2007 World Artistic Gymnastics Championships.

References

External links
 
 
 
 

1983 births
Living people
Spanish male artistic gymnasts
Gymnasts at the 2004 Summer Olympics
Gymnasts at the 2008 Summer Olympics
Olympic gymnasts of Spain
Gymnasts from Madrid
Mediterranean Games gold medalists for Spain
Mediterranean Games bronze medalists for Spain
Competitors at the 2005 Mediterranean Games
Competitors at the 2009 Mediterranean Games
Mediterranean Games medalists in gymnastics
European champions in gymnastics
20th-century Spanish people
21st-century Spanish people